The Biel International Chess Festival is an annual chess tournament that takes place in Biel/Bienne, Switzerland. It consists of two events, the Grandmaster Tournament, held with the round-robin system, and the Master Open Tournament (MTO), held with the Swiss system. The Grandmaster Tournament has taken place since 1977. The city of Biel hosted three Interzonal Tournaments, in 1976, 1985 and 1993.

{| class="sortable wikitable"
! # !! Year !! Grandmaster Tournament !!Master Open Tournament 
|-
| 1 || 1968 || || 
|-
| 2 || 1969 || || 
|-
| 3 || 1970 || || 
|-
| 4 || 1971 || || 
|-
| 5 || 1972 || || 
|-
| 6 || 1973 || || 
|-
| 7 || 1974 || || 
|-
| 8 || 1975 || ||  
|-
| 9 || 1976 ||  (Interzonal) ||   
|-
| 10 || 1977 ||   || 
|-
| 11 || 1978 ||  || 
|-
| 12 || 1979 ||  ||   
|-
| 13 || 1980 ||  ||       
|-
| 14 || 1981 ||  ||       
|-
| 15 || 1982 ||  ||  
|-
| 16 || 1983 ||  || 
|-
| 17 || 1984 || || 
|-
| 18 || 1985 ||  (Interzonal) ||   
|-
| 19 || 1986 || || 
|-
| 20 || 1987 ||   || 
|-
| 21 || 1988 || ||
|-
| 22 || 1989 || ||
|-
| 23 || 1990 || ||
|-
| 24 || 1991 || ||
|-
| 25 || 1992 || ||
|-
| 26 || 1993 ||  (Interzonal)||
|-
| 27 || 1994 || ||
|-
| 28 || 1995 || || 
|-
| 29 || 1996 || ||  
|-
| 30 || 1997 || || 
|-
| 31 || 1998 || || 
|-
| 32 || 1999 ||  || 
|-
| 33 || 2000 || || 
|-
| 34 || 2001 || || 
|-
| 35 || 2002 || || 
|-
| 36 || 2003 || || 
|-
| 37 || 2004 || || 
|-
| 38 || 2005 ||  || 
|-
| 39 || 2006 ||  || 
|-
| 40 || 2007 ||  || 
|-
| 41 || 2008 ||  || 
|-
| 42 || 2009 ||  || 
|-
| 43 || 2010 ||  || 
|-
| 44 || 2011 ||  || 
|-
| 45 || 2012 ||  || 
|-
| 46 || 2013 ||  || 
|-
| 47 || 2014 ||  || 
|-
| 48 || 2015 ||  || 
|-
| 49 || 2016 ||  ||
|-
| 50 || 2017 ||   || 
|-
| 51 || 2018 ||  || 
|-
| 52 || 2019 ||   || 
|-
| 53 || 2020 ||   || 
|-
| 54 || 2021 ||   || 
|-
| 55 || 2022 ||   || 
|}

References

External links
 Official website

Chess competitions
Chess in Switzerland
Recurring sporting events established in 1968